Chryseobacterium daecheongense  is a Gram-negative, non-spore-forming and non-motile bacteria from the genus of Chryseobacterium which has been isolated from freshwater lake sediments.

References

Further reading

External links
Type strain of Chryseobacterium daecheongense at BacDive -  the Bacterial Diversity Metadatabase

daecheongense
Bacteria described in 2005